The I-League was founded as the top tier of Indian football for the start of the 2007–08 season. The following page details the football records and statistics of the I-League since then.

Club records

Titles
Most titles: 3, Dempo
Most consecutive title wins: 2, Gokulam Kerala FC

Wins
Most wins in a season: 18, Salgaocar (2010–11)
Fewest wins in a season: 1, Salgaocar (2007–08)
Longest winning streak: 10, Mohun Bagan (2008-09)

Losses
Most losses in a season: 16, Vasco (2008–09)
Fewest losses in a season: 2, joint record:
Dempo (2007–08)
Churchill Brothers (2008–09)
Longest losing streak: 6, joint record:
Chirag United (2011–12)
Air India FC (2012–13)
Mumbai FC (2016–17)

Goals
Most goals scored in a single season: 531, 182 matches (2012–13)
Most goals scored by a team in a season: 63, Dempo (2010–11)
Fewest goals scored by a team in a season: 10, Air India (2007–08)
Most goals conceded by a team in a season (26 games): 63
Air India (2012–13)
United Sikkim (2012–13)
Fewest goals conceded by a team in a season: 13, Dempo (2007–08)
Best goal difference of a team in a season: 34, Churchill Brothers (2012–13)
Worst goal difference of a team in a season: -40, United Sikkim (2012–13)

Points
 Most points in a season: 56, Salgaocar (2010–11)
 Fewest points in a season: 10, Vasco (2008–09)
 Most points in a season without winning the league:
 26 games: Pune, 52, (2012–13)
 Fewest points in a season while winning the league: 
 16 games: Bengaluru FC, 32, (2015–16)
 Most points in a season while being relegated:
 26 games: Sporting Clube de Goa, 27, (2009–10)
 Fewest points in a season while surviving relegation: Air India, 17, (2007–08)

Player records (NFL included)

Players in 100-goal club

Top Indian scorers
Top five Indian goalscorers are listed below.

Other individual records
 Most individual goals in a match: 6 by  Ranti Martins, Dempo vs Air India (2010–11)
 Most goals in one edition: 32 by  Ranti Martins, Dempo (2011–12)
 Fastest goal in a match:  Katsumi Yusa — 13 seconds, NEROCA vs Churchill Brothers (2018–19)
 Most number of hat-tricks:  Odafa Onyeka Okolie (13)

References

I-League lists

See also
List of Indian football first tier top scorers